Dhanpur may refer to the following places in India:

 Dhanpur, Himachal Pradesh
 Dhanpur, Gujarat, a taluka in Dahod district
 Dhanpur (Vidhan Sabha constituency), Tripura
 Dhanpur, Moulvibazar, a village in the Akhailkura Union.

See also
 Dhanpuri
 Thonburi